"Keep Their Heads Ringin'" is a song by American rapper Dr. Dre featuring vocalist Nanci Fletcher. It was the only single released from the soundtrack of the 1995 movie Friday, starring Ice Cube and Chris Tucker. Although the soundtrack was released on Priority Records, Death Row Records still owns the masters to the song. In the United States, the song topped the Hot Rap Tracks chart and peaked at number ten on the Billboard Hot 100. It was certified gold by the RIAA on May 10, 1995, and sold 700,000 copies domestically. It interpolates "Funk You Up" by The Sequence from their 1980 single released under Sugar Hill.

Critical reception
Dr. Bayyan from Cash Box wrote, "Well, there is no doubt that the patented "Dre funk" is present, but there's one aspect that fans will notice about this single. He concentrates more on his improved lyrical delivery rather than on killin' niggas and cheekin' ho's. Dre is one of the few rappers that doesn't have to tone down his hardcore image to gain commercial status."

Music video
The accompanying music video for "Keep Their Heads Ringin'" was directed by F. Gary Gray and takes place in a plane hangar. The video contains cameo appearances from the actors of the movie Friday including Chris Tucker, Faizon Love and Nia Long. New Line offered the clip to theatres to play right before showings of Friday. It also appears as a bonus feature on the VHS and DVD releases of the film.

Track listing
 CD single / 12" vinyl
 "Keep Their Heads Ringin'" (LP Version) — 5:01
 "Keep Their Heads Ringin'" (Instrumental) — 4:57
 "Take a Hit" (by Mack 10) (LP Version) — 4:34
 "Take a Hit" (by Mack 10) (Instrumental) — 4:34

 US 12" vinyl
 "Keep Their Heads Ringin'" (Radio Version) — 5:02
 "Keep Their Heads Ringin'" (LP Version) — 5:01
 "Keep Their Heads Ringin'" (Instrumental) — 4:57

Personnel
Co-producer - Sam Sneed
Engineer - Tommy D. Daugherty and Keston Wright
Keyboards - Stu "Fingas" Bullard
Producer - Dr. Dre
Chorus Sample - KRS-One
Lead vocals - Nanci Fletcher
Background Vocals - Nanci Fletcher, Barbara Wilson, Dorothy Coleman
Video director - F. Gary Gray
Actors - Chris Tucker, Nia Long and Tiny Lister
Angie Stone is credited for writing the song due to her writing to "Funk You Up". She is credited as A. Brown in the credits of the song since she did not go by Angie Stone at the time she recorded "Funk You Up". Angela Brown is Angie Stone's birth name.

Charts

Weekly charts

Year-end charts

Certifications

References

External links 

1995 singles
Dr. Dre songs
Songs written by Dr. Dre
Song recordings produced by Dr. Dre
Gangsta rap songs
G-funk songs
Friday (franchise) music